Hernando Pizarro y de Vargas (born between 1501 and 1508, died 1578) was a Spanish conquistador and one of the Pizarro brothers who ruled over Peru.

Hernando was born in Trujillo, (Extremadura), Spain, son of Captain Gonzalo Pizarro y Rodríguez de Aguilar (senior) (1446–1522) – who as colonel of infantry served in the Italian campaigns under Gonzalo Fernández de Córdoba, and in Navarre, with some distinction – and wife Isabel de Vargas.

Pizarro Brothers
As one of the Pizarro brothers, he was related to Francisco, Juan, and Gonzalo Pizarro.  He had two full sisters, Inés Pizarro y de Vargas and Isabel Pizarro y de Vargas, married to Gonzalo de Tapia.  Through his father, he was a second cousin of Hernán Cortés.

Inca Empire 
Starting in 1532 and succeeding in 1533, Francisco Pizarro conquered the Inca Empire and claimed what we know today as Peru for Spain. In the 16th century the Incas were conquered by the Spaniards, Hernando Pizarro, who was the brother of the chief commander of the conquest Francisco Pizarro, writes a letter to the royal audience of Santo Domino about the expedition. Hernando Pizarro wrote this letter on November 1533. Hernando Pizarro starts his letter by explaining how the government founded a town called San Miguel and then proceeded to search for the town of Cajamarca whose rulers have been fighting. In this letter, we get a better understanding of what type of person Hernando Pizarro was. In the letter, Hernando gives a description image of his surroundings while on the expedition "The road over the mountains is a thing worth seeing, because, though the ground is so rugged, such beautiful roads could not in truth be found throughout Christendom. The greater part of them is paved. There is a bridge of stone or wood over every stream. We found bridges of network over a very large and powerful river, which we crossed twice, which was a marvelous thing to see." Hernando Pizarro was a very intellectual man with a great appreciation for his surroundings, one of the many reasons for why his part in conquering the Inca Empire with his brother, Francisco Pizarro, was essential.

The New World
Unlike his other brothers, he was born in wedlock, and he was educated and gained influence in the Spanish court.  In 1530 Hernando departed for the New World with his half-brother, Francisco Pizarro, and accompanied him during his conquests in Peru.  In 1533, Hernando was sent back to Spain with the royal fifth for the Emperor, which consisted of "a number of the most beautiful articles" collected for Atahuallpa's ransom.

Hernando arrived Seville on 9 January, 1534, proceeded to Calatayud, and an audience with Charles.  Hernando delivered the royal fifth and recounted the Pizarro brothers' adventures.  Charles confirmed Francisco Pizarro's previous grants, extending them seventy leagues further south, and then gave Francisco's partner, Diego de Almagro, a grant two hundred leagues further south.

When he returned to Peru, he ruled with his other half-brothers (Juan and Gonzalo Pizarro) over the prized Inca capital of Cuzco.  Governing with an iron fist, he helped with the eventual suppression of Inca uprisings led by Manco Inca.

Cuzco
After Diego de Almagro returned from Chile from a fruitless gold-seeking expedition, he found that Hernando and his brothers were in control of Cuzco.  However, as he had not obtained any credit for having been Francisco Pizarro's main partner in discovering Peru, he decided to claim Cuzco as part of his share.  Almagro seized the city in 1537, capturing Hernando and Juan. Hernando was eventually released after negotiations between Almagro and Francisco, and in 1538 he and Gonzalo returned with an army to confront Almagro. In the ensuing Battle of Las Salinas, the Pizarros won a decisive victory, capturing Almagro and the city.

The execution of Almagro later that year and the general disorder caused by the Spanish infighting caused substantial fallout in the Spanish court.  Hernando was again called upon to leverage his royal contacts: in 1539 he returned to Spain to lobby in favor of the Pizarros.  Their perceived treachery was too great, however, and despite Hernando's bribery, he was imprisoned for the next twenty years, from June 1541 until May 1561, in the Castle of La Mota.   He then lived in his Trujillo palace until his death in 1578.

Family
In 1552, Hernando married his niece, Francisca Pizarro Yupanqui (she was the daughter of Francisco Pizarro and his Inca mistress Inés Yupanqui) in Spain. Although born out of wedlock, she was legitimized by Imperial Decree.  They had five children. One of their sons, Francisco Pizarro y Pizarro, married twice and had offspring, the Marqueses de La Conquista. As a result, the Pizarro line survived Hernando's death, though currently it is extinct in male line.

His father was a son of Fernando Alonso Pizarro and wife Isabel de Vargas Rodríguez de Aguilar, paternal grandson of Fernando or Hernando Alonso de Hinojosa and wife Teresa Martínez Pizarro, and brother of Juan Pizarro, who died without issue in 1521, and Diego Fernández Pizarro, who married Marina López and had a son Fernando Pizarro López, who had a natural son named Diego Pizarro de Vargas, married to Juana Rodríguez de Bobadilla, with female issue in Portugal.

Ancestors

References

External links

 Letter from Hernando Pizarro to the Royal Audience of Santo Domingo, in Reports on the Discovery of Peru
 "Hernando Pizarro", The Columbia Electronic Encyclopedia.
 

1508 births
1578 deaths
People from Tierra de Trujillo
Colonial Peru
Spanish colonization of the Americas
Extremaduran conquistadors
16th-century Spanish people
16th-century Peruvian people